Four Seasons Hotel and Private Residences Denver is a  tall skyscraper in Denver, Colorado. This makes it the 4th tallest building in Denver. It is estimated to cost $350 million, or $456.63 per sq. ft., which would make it the most expensive privately owned building ever constructed in Denver. It is a mixed-used building, containing a pool, fitness center and amenities.

The lower 24 floors contains the Four Season Hotel, while the upper 21 floors contain residential suites. The hotel operates 239 guest rooms 
& suites, as of 2010 it is the tallest mixed used tower in Denver.

See also
List of tallest buildings in Denver

References

External links
Four Seasons Hotel Denver
Four Seasons Private Residences Denver
Skyscraperpage

Further reading

Condo hotels in the United States
Four Seasons hotels and resorts
Hotels established in 2010
Hotels in Denver
Residential buildings completed in 2010
Residential skyscrapers in Denver
Skyscraper hotels in Denver